The ZhuZhus (formerly known as Polly and the ZhuZhu Pets) is an animated children's television series developed by Hugh Duffy for Disney Channel and YTV. The series is based on the American toy franchise ZhuZhu Pets. It is the second animated adaptation starring the Fab Four; Pipsqueak, Mr. Squiggles, Num Nums, and Chunk, following Quest for Zhu in 2011.

The series is about Frankie Pamplemousse, a young girl who owns four talking hamsters. It debuted on Disney Channel in the United States on September 12, 2016.

Plot
The ZhuZhus is about 8-year-old Frankie Pamplemousse, who lives in Anytown with her parents who run a plumbing home business called Pamplemouse Plumbing. She owns four talking hamsters called the ZhuZhus; Pipsqueak, Mr. Squiggles, Num Nums, and Chunk, as they have adventures in their town.

Characters

Main
 Frankie Pamplemousse (voiced by Jenna Warren) is the 8-year-old owner of the ZhuZhus. She likes sports and hanging out with her friends, the ZhuZhus. She has blonde hair and blue eyes. Before the redub of the series, she was originally named Polly.
 Pipsqueak (voiced by Tajja Isen)  is Frankie's first ZhuZhu, and the unofficial leader of the ZhuZhus. She loves adventure, and will do anything to help Frankie and the team out. She is fearless, energetic, and very loyal to Frankie. She is yellow and her birthmark, which are located on the Zhus' backs, is a shooting star because she always fires ideas and enthusiasm in every way.
 Mr. Squiggles (voiced by Richard Binsley) is Frankie's second ZhuZhu. He is very smart, resourceful, and likes science. He also creates machines and gadgets that help the team out when in need. He is orange, has wrinkles under his eyes, wears a belt, and his birthmark is a spiral because his mind always spins with new ideas. 
 Num Nums (voiced by Stephany Seki) is Frankie's third ZhuZhu, and Pipsqueak's best friend. She is a very shy and a cautious thinker, and isn't as daring as the rest of the team, but she will  do anything to help them. Despite this however, she still has a tough side whenever she or the team is insulted. She is purple, wears pink glasses, and her birthmark is a heart because she always wears it on her sleeve. 
 Chunk (voiced by Robert Tinkler) is Frankie's fourth ZhuZhu, and the tallest Zhu. As his name suggests, he is very chunky and strong. He is also very stylish and narcissistic, and usually serves as the comic relief. His cousins are Jilly and Bean, two mischievous twins. He is grey and his birthmark is a sun because he lights up the whole room whenever he smiles.

Recurring
 Ellen Pamplemousse or "Mom" (voiced by Stacey DePass) is Frankie's mother and a professional plumber for Pamplemousse Plumbing. She used to be a part of the Power Badge Girls.
 Stanley Pamplemousse or "Dad" (voiced by Zachary Bennett) is Frankie's father and also a professional plumber for Pamplemousse Plumbing. He loves music and was previously a Wilderness Teen Ranger. Thus, he knows a lot about nature.
 Wilfred P. Kerdle or Mr. Kerdle (voiced by Patrick McKenna) is the cranky janitor of Frankie's school. He tries to stop the Zhus from coming into the school and insults them.
 Cindy and Mindy Gelato (voiced by Rebecca Brenner and Samantha Weinstein) are twins and Frankie's friends.
 Madge Mervins (voiced by Brianna D'Aguanno) is Frankie's neighbor and worst enemy. She always tries to beat Frankie at everything. She has blue hair and brown eyes and a cat named Princess Tickyboo.
 Whendy Sails (voiced by Nicole Stamp) is a celebrity and news reporter for Channel 5.
 Jessica Beeker (voiced by Addison Holley) is Frankie's favorite popstar.
 Dr. Phelmholz (voiced by Rob Rubin) is an Austrian doctor from Vienna.

Production
The ZhuZhus is produced by Nelvana and Cepia LLC, in association with Corus Entertainment. The series is animated using Toon Boom Animation and recorded in Studio 306 Inc. It was first announced on February 12, 2015 by Kristin Musulin of USA Today as a Nelvana production, with a planned release of 2016. The show was originally referred to as "ZhuZhu Pets" before the official title was revealed. The last episode to air on Disney Channel with that title was "Fur-Vivor/Zhuper Girl", which premiered on October 21, 2016, and the show went on a hiatus. After its hiatus the series gained a new name and Polly's name was changed to Frankie for the rest of the series' run. Eventually all seven episodes that were previously broadcast on Disney Channel were redubbed to say Frankie instead of Polly.

Episodes

Shorts
A short webseries called "Zhu's News" was released to YTV's YouTube channel starting July 17, 2017. Each episode stars Whendy Sails of Channel 5 recapping moments in the series.

Release

Broadcast
The ZhuZhus debuted on Disney Channel in the United States on September 12, 2016 as Polly and the ZhuZhu Pets. After the show went on a hiatus and changed its name, the first episode to air was "Zhu Years Eve/Lookies for Cookies" on January 7, 2017, and the show was added to the Get Animated! block. On August 29, 2016, Denise Petski of Deadline Hollywood announced that Disney Channels Worldwide acquired both multi-territory broadcast and on demand rights to The ZhuZhus in Australia, Austria, Belgium, Central and Eastern Europe, Germany, Luxembourg, the Middle East, the Netherlands, New Zealand, Russia, Sub-Saharan Africa, and Switzerland. The series aired on Disney Channel in Australia and New Zealand on February 13, 2017, Disney Channel in South Africa on March 6, and Boomerang in the United Kingdom and Ireland on May 2. The series was scheduled to premiere on YTV in Canada in December 2016, but eventually it premiered on July 4, 2017. Reruns in Canada premiere airs on Disney Channel and Disney Junior.

Home media
On September 25, 2018, Cinedigm released a DVD featuring all 26 episodes of the series named "The ZhuZhus: Season 1".

Reception
Emily Ashby of Common Sense Media rated The ZhuZhus a 3 out of 5 stars, stating "the series does well to stand on its own entertainment merit, but it can't avoid commercial tie-ins altogether." Bruce Katz of Cepia feels that "the animation further enhanced the personality of the characters," and says that "they've captured the essence of what ZhuZhu Pets is all about."

Media information
Two online games are currently available on The ZhuZhus website called Tube Racers and Costume Couture. An app was also released on April 18, 2017 called The ZhuZhus: Zhuniverse, which is available to play on iTunes and Google Play.

Notes

References

External links
 
 
 

2010s American animated television series
2010s Canadian animated television series
2016 American television series debuts
2017 American television series endings
2016 Canadian television series debuts
2017 Canadian television series endings
American children's animated adventure television series
American children's animated comedy television series
American children's animated fantasy television series
American children's animated musical television series
Canadian children's animated adventure television series
Canadian children's animated comedy television series
Canadian children's animated fantasy television series
Canadian children's animated musical television series
American flash animated television series
Canadian flash animated television series
English-language television shows
Disney Channel original programming  
YTV (Canadian TV channel) original programming
Fictional hamsters
Animated television series about mammals
Animated television series about children
Television series by Corus Entertainment
Television series by Nelvana